Queensbridge may refer to:

 One Queensbridge, an approved supertall skyscraper in Melbourne, Australia
 Queensbridge Houses, a public housing development in New York, United States
 21st Street–Queensbridge station, a subway station named for the housing development
 Queensbridge School, a school in Moseley, England
 Queensbridge (ward), a former electoral ward in Hackney, London

See also
 Queen's Bridge (disambiguation)